Ekattor is a Bengali-language streaming television series directed by Tanim Noor. It was released on OTT platform hoichoi on 26 March 2020, Independence Day of Bangladesh. The series stars Mostofa Monowar, Nusrat Imrose Tisha, Iresh Zaker, Rafiath Rashid Mithila, Mostafizur Noor Imran in the lead roles along with Tariq Anam Khan, Shatabdi Wadud and Deepanwita Martin in significant roles.

Cast 
Mostafa Monowar as Selim:
A gang-leader of old Dhaka. He owns a garage & loves Joyita.  
Nusrat Imrose Tisha as Joyita:
A university student & activist.    
Iresh Zaker as Major Wasim:
A well-known Pakistan Army officer who was in charge of Operation Blitz at Dacca.     
Rafiath Rashid Mithila as Ruhi:
A West-pakistani journalist & wife of Major Wasim.  
A Bengali Pakistan Army officer who steals a top secret file.
Tariq Anam Khan as Gul Mohammad:
A Pakistan Army officer of Dacca.   
Shatabdi Wadud as Prodip:
A top Awami League leader.  
Deepanwita Martin

Series Overview

Season 1 (2019)
The story is based on Operation Blitz that occurred in the year 1971 in East Pakistan presently known as Bangladesh. Captain Shiraj who is a Protagonist played by Mostafizur, tries to collect the file of Operation Blitz. He wants to hand over the file to the international mass media before the disaster happens. While being chased by Pakistani Army troop he takes shelter in Salim’s garage. He intends to seek help from others to build up a resistance against the Pakistani army. The unexpected attack of Salim leaves the Pakistani army baffled.

References

External links

Indian web series
2017 web series debuts
Bengali-language web series
Hoichoi original programming